"Comforter" is a song by Shai, issued as the second single from their debut studio album ...If I Ever Fall in Love. The song was written by group members Carl Martin, Darnell Van Rensalier and Marc Gay, with Martin also handling production.

Music video

The official music video for the song was directed by Ian Fletcher.

Charts

Weekly charts

Year-end charts

References

External links
 

1992 songs
1993 singles
MCA Records singles
Shai (band) songs